Maršal may refer to:
Marshal of Yugoslavia
Marshal Tito's Spirit, a 1999 Croatian film